Phloeolaemus is a genus of beetles in the family Laemophloeidae, containing the following species:

 Phloeolaemus anticus Sharp
 Phloeolaemus boops Sharp
 Phloeolaemus chamaeropis Schwarz
 Phloeolaemus championi Sharp
 Phloeolaemus curtus Grouvelle
 Phloeolaemus endomychus Sharp
 Phloeolaemus hoplites Sharp
 Phloeolaemus ignobilis Sharp
 Phloeolaemus immersus Sharp
 Phloeolaemus impressus Grouvelle
 Phloeolaemus macrocephalus Schaeffer
 Phloeolaemus punctulaticollis Hetschko
 Phloeolaemus quinquearticulatus Grouvelle
 Phloeolaemus reitteri Grouvelle
 Phloeolaemus sharpi Hetschko
 Phloeolaemus teapensis Grouvelle

References

Laemophloeidae